The Adam Pence House in Lincoln County, Kentucky near Stanford, Kentucky, was built in 1851. It was listed on the National Register of Historic Places in 1978.  Although apparently still NRHP-listed, it has apparently been demolished.

It was a red brick I-house with a rear ell, fronted by four two-story white pillars.  In 1978 it was deemed "architecturally significant as being one of the grand Greek Revival rural residences of Lincoln County to survive in a relatively unaltered state."

It was built for Adam Pence in 1851 with bricks made ("burned") on its property, and with lumber transported from Somerset, Kentucky. Adam Pence fought in the War of 1812 and the house was built on land given to him for his service in that war.  

An 1898 photo of the home, labelled as the "Matheny-Pence House on Old Somerset Road", appears in a Lincoln County history compiled by the local historical society. Labelled as "Yankees" in the photo are husband and wife Adam Richard Matheny and Franciska Hornath Matheny.

By 2022, the house appears to have been demolished. This is close to the coordinates provided with NRIS 2013 data, within usual variance of such vs. modern GPS mapping. However a Google Maps satellite view, presumably later, shows ruins at that site.

References

External links
Full text of "A history of Pence place names and early Pences in America, with genealogies", at Internet Archive.

National Register of Historic Places in Lincoln County, Kentucky
Houses completed in 1851
Greek Revival architecture in Kentucky
I-houses in Kentucky
Demolished but still listed on the National Register of Historic Places
Former buildings and structures in Kentucky
1851 establishments in Kentucky